Bernt Sverdrup Maschmann (17 October 1805 – 13 May 1869) was a Norwegian priest, politician and pharmacist.

Bernt Maschmann was born in Christiania (now Oslo), Norway. He was a son of pharmacist Hans Henrich Maschmann. He earned his Cand.theol. in 1829. He was the pastor of Vega in Nordland from 1830 and then the vicar at Hobøl in Østfold from 1837 to 1869.  In addition, from 1849 he was provost for the Øvre Borgesyssel deanery in the Diocese of Borg.

Maschmann was elected to the Norwegian Parliament in 1845, representing the constituency of Smaalenenes Amt which corresponds to the current Østfold. In 1856, he acquired the family pharmaceutical business, Elefantapoteket i Christiania, which he operated until 1860.

He was married to Antoinette Augusta Aars with whom he had five children. They were the maternal great-parents of jurist and magistrate Harald Gram. He was the father-in-law of the book collector Thorvald Boeck.

References

1805 births
1869 deaths
Clergy from Oslo
Norwegian priest-politicians
Members of the Storting
Østfold politicians
Norwegian pharmacists
People from Oslo in health professions